Pigritia marjoriella is a moth in the family Blastobasidae. It is found in Costa Rica.

The length of the forewings is 3.8–6 mm. The forewings have greyish-brown scales tipped with white intermixed with greyish-brown scales and white scales. The hindwings are translucent pale brown, gradually darkening from a third of the length to the apex.

References

Moths described in 1998
Blastobasidae